The gapik is a monetary unit of Azerbaijan, equal to  of the Azerbaijani manat. The 2006 redenomination of the manat introduced coins of 1-, 3-, 5-, 10-, 20-, and 50 gapiks into circulation.

The 1, 3 and 5 gapik are made of copper-covered steel. The 10 and 20 gapik are of brass-covered steel, and the 50 gapik is bimetallic.

Notes

Coins of Azerbaijan
Currencies of Azerbaijan
Currencies introduced in 1919
Currencies introduced in 1992